The tenth season of the American television series Bones premiered on September 25, 2014, and concluded on June 11, 2015, on Fox. The show moved time slots from its previous season, airing on Thursdays at 8:00 pm ET.

Cast and characters

Main cast 
 Emily Deschanel as Dr. Temperance "Bones" Brennan, a forensic anthropologist, and wife of Seeley Booth 
 David Boreanaz as FBI Special Agent Seeley Booth, who is the official FBI liaison with the Jeffersonian, and husband of Temperance Brennan 
 Michaela Conlin as Angela Montenegro, a forensic artist and wife of Jack Hodgins
 Tamara Taylor as Dr. Camille Saroyan, a forensic pathologist, the head of the forensic division
 T. J. Thyne as Dr. Jack Hodgins, an entomologist, mineralogist, palynologist, and forensic chemist, and husband of Angela Montenegro
 John Francis Daley as Dr. Lance Sweets, an FBI psychologist who provides psychological reports on criminals and staff including Brennan and Booth
 John Boyd as James Aubrey, a junior FBI agent working under Booth

Recurring cast 
 Sunnie Pelant as Christine Booth, Seeley and Temperance's daughter
 Patricia Belcher as Caroline Julian, a prosecutor who often works with the team
 Andrew Leeds as Christopher Pelant, a hacker
 Sterling Macer, Jr. as Victor Stark, the FBI Deputy Director
 Ryan O'Neal as Max Keenan, Brennan's father
 Sam Anderson as Hugo Sanderson, the owner of a powerful organization that may be the origin of the FBI conspiracy
 Michael Badalucco as Scott Starret, a previous Jeffersonian intern
 Billy Gibbons as Angela's father
 Cyndi Lauper as Avalon Harmonia, a psychic
 Danny Woodburn as Alex Radziwill, a Diplomatic immunity and State Department official
 Mather Zickel as Aldo Clemens, an ex-priest who counseled Booth when he was a sniper

Interns
 Carla Gallo as Daisy Wick
 Michael Grant Terry as Wendell Bray
 Eugene Byrd as Dr. Clark Edison
 Laura Spencer as Jessica Warren
 Pej Vahdat as Arastoo Vaziri
 Ignacio Serricchio as Rodolfo Fuentes
 Brian Klugman as Dr. Oliver Wells

Production
The series was renewed for a tenth season on January 29, 2014. Series creator Hart Hanson stepped down as showrunner for the tenth season to focus on his new TV series, Backstrom; longtime executive producer and writer Stephan Nathan took over the role of showrunner. In January 2014, Fox Entertainment President Kevin Reilly commented that season 10 would possibly be the final season, but in July 2014, Fox chairman and CEO Peter Rice commented, "I hope it's not the last year ... it's a fantastic series, it's famously moved all over our schedule for 10 years ... It's [Emily Deschanel and David Boreanaz's] last year contractually, so we have to have that conversation ... but I hope that they will come back." The tenth season features the series' 200th episode, written by Stephen Nathan and directed by series star David Boreanaz, which is an Alfred Hitchcock homage set in the 1950s.

In July 2014, John Boyd was cast in a recurring role of James Aubrey, a junior FBI agent working under Booth. However, it was later revealed that Boyd would be a series regular. The character of Lance Sweets, portrayed by John Francis Daley who joined the cast in the third season, is killed off in the season premiere episode. The decision to kill off the character was because Daley needed a break from the series to direct the upcoming National Lampoon's Vacation remake, Vacation, and executive producer Stephan Nathan thought killing off the character instead of just writing him off would be more impactful. With the series' 206th episode, Bones became the longest-running one-hour drama for producing studio 20th Century Fox Television, and the episode also names all 206 bones in the human body. Emily Deschanel's real-life pregnancy was written into the show (like her first pregnancy), and the season features the reveal that Brennan is pregnant with her and Booth's second child. The season finale was written as a potential series finale, as it was written before the writers knew the series was renewed for another season.

Episodes

Ratings

Live +7 DVR ratings
Live +7 ratings is the number of viewers who watched a particular episode live, plus the number of viewers via DVR over a seven-day period from the original broadcast.

DVD release 
The tenth season of Bones was released on DVD (subtitled "Blackmail & Jail Edition") in region 1 on September 29, 2015, and in region 2 on October 12, 2015. The set includes all 22 episodes of season ten on a 6-disc DVD set presented in anamorphic widescreen. Special features include deleted scenes, a gag reel, and two featurettes—"Sweets' Sweetest Moments" and "From Script to Screen: Creating the 200th Episode".

Notes

References 

General references

External links 
 
 

Season 10
2014 American television seasons
2015 American television seasons